

0-9

	
	10th of Ramadan
	15th of May
       6th of October

A

 Abu El Matamir
 Abu Hummus
 Abu Tesht
 Akhmim
 Al Khankah
 Alexandria
 Arish
 Ashmoun
 Aswan
 Asyut
 Awsim

B

	Badr
	Baltim 
	Banha 
	Basyoun
	Biyala 
	Belqas
	Beni Mazar
	Beni Suef
	Beni Ebeid
 	Biba 
	Bilbeis
	Birket El Sab 
       Borg El Arab
       Borg El Burullus
	Bush

C

	Cairo

D

 Dahab
	Dairut 
	Damanhur 
	Damietta
	Dar El Salam 
	Daraw
	Deir Mawas 
	Dekernes
   Dendera
	Desouk
   Diarb Negm
	Dishna

E

	Edfu
	Edku
       El Alamein
	El Arish
       El Ayyat
	El Badari
       El Badrashein
	El Bagour
	El Balyana
	El Basaliya 
	El Bayadiya 
	El Dabaa
	El Delengath
	El Fashn
	El Gamaliya
	El Ghanayem
	El Hamool 
	El Hamam 
       El Hawamdeya
	El Husseiniya
	El Idwa
	El Ibrahimiya
	El Kanayat
	El Kareen
	El Mahalla El Kubra
	El Mahmoudiyah 
	El Mansha
	El Manzala
	El Maragha 
	El Matareya 
	El Qantara
	El Qanater El Khayreya
	El Qoseir
	El Qusiya  
	El Rahmaniya
	El Reyad
	El Rhoda
       El Saff
	El Santa
	El Sarw
	El Sebaiya
	El Senbellawein 
	El Shohada
	El Shorouk
	El Tor 
	El Waqf
	El Wasta
	El Zarqa
	Esna
	Ezbet El Borg

F

	Faqous 
	Faraskur 
	Farshut 
	Fayed 
	Faiyum
	Fuka

G

	Girga
	Giza

H

	Hihya 
	Hosh Essa 
	Hurghada

I

	Ibsheway 
	Ihnasiya 
	Ismailia
	Itay El Barud
	Itsa

J

	Juhayna

K

	Kafr El Sheikh
	Kafr El Zayat 
	Kafr El Batikh 
	Kafr El Dawwar
	Kafr Saad 
	Kafr Saqr 
	Kafr Shukr
   Kafr Zarqan
   Kerdasa
	Khanka 
	Kharga
	Khusus 
	Kom Hamada 
	Kom Ombo 
	Kotoor

L

	Luxor

M

	Maghagha 
	Mallawi 
	Manfalut 
	Mansoura
	Mashtool El Souk 
	Matai 
	Menouf
	Marsa Alam
	Mersa Matruh
	Metoubes 
	Minya
	Minyet El Nasr
 	Mit Abu El Kom
 	Mit Abu Ghaleb
 	Mit Adlan
 	Mit Bera
 	Mit El Korama
 	Mit Elwan
 	Mit Fadala
	Mit Ghamr
	Mit Kenana
	Mit Rahina
	Mit Salsil
	Mit Sudan
	Mit Yazid
        Monsha'at El-Qanater
	Mut

N

	Nabaroh 
	Nag Hammadi 
	Naqada
	New Administrative Capital (NAC)
   New Alamein
	New Aswan
	New Akhmim
	New Asyut
	New Beni Suef
	New Borg El Arab
	New Cairo
	New Damietta
	New Faiyum
	New Minya
	New Nubariya
	New Salhia
	New Sohag
	New Tiba
	New Qena

O

	Obour

P

	Port Said

Q

	Qaha 
	Qallin 
	Qalyub 
	Qena
	Qift 
	Quesna 
	Qus

R

	Rafah
	Ras Burqa 
	Ras El Bar 
	Ras Gharib
	Ras Sedr  
	Ras Shokeir  
	Rosetta

S

	Sadat
	Safaga 
	Sahel Selim 
	Saint Catherine
	Samalut 
	Samanoud 
	Saqultah 
       
	Shubra Khit 
	Sers El Lyan 
	Sharm El Sheikh
	Sherbin
	Sheikh Zuweid  
	Shibin El Qanater 
	Shibin El Kom 
	Shubra El Kheima 
	Sidi Barrani 
	Sidi Salem 
	Sinnuris 
	Siwa Oasis 
	Sodfa 
	Sohag
	Suez
	Sumusta El Waqf

T

	Tahta 
	Tala 
	Talkha 
	Tamiya 
	Tanta 
	Tell El Kebir
	Tima 
	Tukh

W

	Wadi El Natrun

Z

	Zagazig
	Zefta

Largest cities

* Cities that are part of Greater Cairo metropolitan area.

See also
 List of towns and villages in Egypt
 Geography of Egypt
 Climate of Egypt
 List of historical capitals of Egypt
 List of urban areas in Africa by population
 List of largest cities in the Arab world
 Lists of cities in Asia

Further reading

References

External links

 
 Egypt's New Urban Communities
 New Urban Communities Authority - Contact Page

 
Egypt, List of cities in
Cities in Egypt, List of
Egypt
Egypt
Egypt